The Hart School is a secondary education academy in Rugeley, England, UK. The school is divided across two sites, and was formed in September 2016 following the merger of Hagley Park Academy and Fair Oak Academy. This was consulted upon and approved in the academic year for 2015–16.

The uniform consists of a grey blazer with blue trim; a grey tie with orange, blue and green stripes; a shirt; plain black trousers or a knee-length skirt; and black shoes.

The Hart of Rugeley is the school's student-led newspaper, published every term.

The Hart school has a capacity of 1238 and currently has 1128 admissions.

References

Secondary schools in Staffordshire
2016 establishments in England
Academies in Staffordshire